The Anawrahta class corvette is a class of corvettes operated by the Myanmar Navy. The UMS Anawrahta (771) was commissioned in 2001. The ship was built locally with Chinese assistance. The Anawrahta class corvette is equipped with various electronic suites and weaponry systems from China, Israel and Russia. The lead ship of the class is named after King Anawrahta, the founder of the Pagan Empire of Myanmar (Burma).

The second ship, 772, named after King Bayinnaung, was commissioned in 2003. The Myanmar Navy launched another stealth corvette UMS Tabinshwehti (773) in November 2014.

Ships of the class

See also
UBS Mayu
Aung Zeya-class frigate
Kyan Sittha-class frigate
UMS Moattama
Inlay-class Offshore Patrol Vessel
5-Series class : Fast Attack Craft

Notes

References

Ship classes built by Myanmar Navy
Corvette classes
Corvettes of Myanmar
Corvettes of the Myanmar Navy
Post–Cold War military equipment of Myanmar